Epichorista aspistana is a species of moth of the family Tortricidae. It is endemic to New Zealand and has been collected in Canterbury and Otago. This species inhabits moist grassy areas at altitudes ranging from sea level to 1650m. Larvae feed on species within the genus Acaena. Adults are on the wing in November to February.

Taxonomy

This species was first described by Edward Meyrick in 1882 using specimens collected by J. D. Enys at Porters Pass and named Proselena aspistana. Meyrick went on to give a fuller description of the species in 1883. In 1911 Meyrick placed this species in the genus Epichorista. George Hudson, in 1928, discussed and illustrated this species in his book The butterflies and moths of New Zealand. In 1988 J. S. Dugdale confirmed this placement. In 2010 this placement was again confirmed by Robert Hoare in the New Zealand Inventory of Biodiversity. The male lectotype, collected at Castle Hill in Canterbury, is held at the Natural History Museum, London.

Description
Meyrick described this species as follows:

Distribution

This species is endemic to New Zealand and has been found at the species type locality of Porters Pass as well as at near Dunedin.

Habitat 
This species inhabits moist grassy areas and has been collected at altitudes ranging from sea level to 1650m.

Host species 
Larvae of this species have been collected on plants in the genus Acaena.

Behaviour 
The larvae of this species web the leaves of its host plants together and feed from this shelter. The adults of this species are on the wing from November to February.

References

Moths described in 1882
Epichorista
Moths of New Zealand
Endemic fauna of New Zealand
Taxa named by Edward Meyrick
Endemic moths of New Zealand